Kalipada Bauri was an Indian politician belonging to Communist Party of India (Marxist). He was elected as MLA of Gangajalghati Vidhan Sabha Constituency in West Bengal Legislative Assembly in 1971. He died on 2 January 2019.

References

2019 deaths
Communist Party of India (Marxist) politicians
West Bengal MLAs 1971–1972
Year of birth missing